The 1962 Syracuse Orangemen football team represented Syracuse University in the 1962 NCAA University Division football season. The offense scored 159 points while the defense allowed 110 points.

Schedule

1963 NFL Draft

References

Syracuse
Syracuse Orange football seasons
Syracuse Orangemen football